Pavel Filip (born 10 April 1966) is a Moldovan politician. In 2001–2008 he was the director of the Joint-stock company "Bucuria" and in 2008–2011, general manager of Tutun-CTC joint stock company. He was then Minister of Information and Communication Technology in the Governments headed by Filat (2), Leancă, Gaburici, and Streleț since 14 January 2011 when he replaced Alexandru Oleinic (2009–2011) and by his investment at the prime minister position on 20 January 2016. He was the deputy chairman of the Democrat Party (DPM). On 7 September 2019 at the IXth Congress of the DPM was elected for the position of the chairman of the Party.

During 2019 Moldovan constitutional crisis from 9 to 15 June, Filip was acting president of Moldova.

Biography

Education
Between 1983 and 1990, he studied at the Polytechnic Institute of Chișinău. He got the qualification of the mechanical engineer. Then, he changed his specialization and, in 1991–1996, he got the bachelor's degree in International Management from the International Management Institute in Chișinău.

Professional activity
 1991–1993, Head of Compressor Division of JSC "Bucuria"
 1993–1994, Director of the Production Department JSC "Bucuria"
 1998–2001, Chief Engineer of JSC "Bucuria", Deputy General Manager for Production and Technology Issues
 2001–2008, General Manager of JSC "Bucuria"
 2008–2011, General Manager of SC "TUTUN-CTC"

Political activity
In 2010, Pavel Filip joined the DPM, because of which he was included in the candidates' list for the early parliamentary elections of 28 November 2010. Prior to joining the Democratic Party, according to the Liberal Democratic Party of Moldova (LDPM) leader, Vlad Filat, within „In depth” TV program (October 2007), Pavel Filip took a part of the initiative group for the LDPM establishing,  together with other personalities. 
Pavel Filip began his political career on 14 January 2011, when he was appointed as minister of the Ministry of Information Technology and Communications.

Prime Minister

On 14 January 2016, when the candidature of Vladimir Plahotniuc (from the DPM side) for the prime-minister position of the Republic of Moldova was rejected, the President Nicolae Timofti has appointed the Secretary General of the President's Office, Ion Păduraru, as candidate for the position of the prime minister. Instantly, one some media agencies have wrote that Păduraru's name appears in the Vlad Filat dossier, more precisely in Ilan Shor's self-denouncing statement. The next day, less than 12 hours after President Nicolae Timofti has appointed the Păduraru candidature for the prime minister position, the DPM leader, Marian Lupu submitted a request stating that the party did not agree with Păduraru's designation and demanded the revocation of the presidential decree on the candidate with the promise that a candidate's short list will be submitted in the near future, and shortly, he submitted his own candidate for the prime minister position, and namely, Pavel Filip, deputy chairman of the DPM and Minister of Information Technology and Communications. In a little while, Ion Păduraru announced that he was withdrawing his candidacy from the post of prime minister in favor of Pavel Filip, and according to other sources, President Nicolae Timofti cancelled the appointment decree of his counsellor Ion Păduaru as candidate for the position of prime minister. After that, the President had designated Pavel Filip as candidate for prime minister position, motivating that he made this decision "following the proposal made by the parliamentary majority of 55 MPs."

The Pavel Filip's government was voted and invested in office despite popular protests held on 20 January 2016, after 16 PM, with the vote of 57 deputies out of 101, without finalizing the presentation of the government program and skipping the questions and answers part, because of the SPRM MPs' protest that held with the parliamentary tribune blocking, which generated a scandal. The new Cabinet of Ministers took the oath in front of the President Nicolae Timofti close to midnight.

According to the polls made in 2019 related to the most respected politicians of the Republic of Moldova, Pavel Filip has only 3,5% of trust. In other polls he is placed at the fourth position and fifth position.

In June 2019, the government of Prime Minister Pavel Filip resigned. He was succeeded by  Moldova's new prime minister, Maia Sandu.

Personal life
He is married to Tatiana Filip, and has two sons, Iulian and Dumitru. Outside of the Romanian language, he is fluent in Russian language and English.

Awards
In 2013, he was awarded the Medal of the International Telecommunication Union – for the contribution in building of the information society. On 23 July 2014 President Nicolae Timofti awarded him the Order of Work Glory as a sign of high appreciation of the contribution to the promotion of the reforms based on European values and standards, for special merits in ensuring the negotiation, signing and ratification of the Association Agreement between the Republic of Moldova and the European Union, the contribution to visa liberalization with the EU Member States and the Schengen Area, and strong efforts in increasing the international prestige of the country.

References

 

1966 births
Democratic Party of Moldova politicians
Government ministers of Moldova
Living people
Moldovan engineers
People from Strășeni District
Prime Ministers of Moldova
Romanian people of Moldovan descent